Shiloh Methodist Church is a historic church in Inman, South Carolina.

It was built in 1825 and added to the National Register of Historic Places in 2005.

References

External links
 Shiloh Methodist Church Historical Marker

Methodist churches in South Carolina
Churches on the National Register of Historic Places in South Carolina
Churches completed in 1825
19th-century Methodist church buildings in the United States
Churches in Spartanburg County, South Carolina
National Register of Historic Places in Spartanburg County, South Carolina